Sengottai railway station (station code: SCT) is a railway station serving the town of Sengottai in Tamil Nadu, India.

The station lies on the century-old Quilon–Madras rail line built during the British Raj.

References

External links
 

Madurai railway division
Railway stations in Tirunelveli district